Terekhov, Terekhova (Russian: Терехов, Терехова) is a common Russian surname. In Estonian it may be transliterated as Terehhov.

It may refer to:

Men
Andrey Terekhov (born 1949), Russian IT developer
Anton Terekhov (born 1998), Russian football player
Igor Terekhov (born 1970), Russian football player
Ihor Terekhov (born 1967), Ukrainian politician
Miguel Terekhov (1928–2012), Uruguayan-born American ballet dancer 
Sergei Yuryevich Terekhov (born 1990), Russian footballer
Sergei Terehhov (born 1975), Estonian footballer

Women
Ekaterina Terekhova, Russian orienteering competitor 
Elena Terekhova (born 1987), Russian footballer
Margarita Terekhova (born 1942), Russian film and theatre actress
Valentina Terekhova, Russian rower

See also
Tereshkov

Surnames of Russian origin